Conewago Falls in Lancaster County, Pennsylvania was a historic river barrier  below and south of Harrisburg<ref
 name=TMI>Three Mile Island Nuclear Generating Station</ref> at a wide spot (<ref
 name="asme"></ref>), where the river drops  in  along the lower Susquehanna River along either side of Three Mile Island.  The falls between the west bank and the west side of the island were inundated-by-design years ago by construction of the York Haven Dam which, when it was completed in 1904, for a time became the third largest in the world. Today the Falls hides inside the Frederic Lake reservoir along the west side of the island.

The falls would often be portaged around by Native Americans with their elm bark canoes transiting between Susquehannock (and later, Iroquois and Lenape) Amerindian towns at points upriver to the Oyster beds in Chesapeake Bay or vice versa. The Falls blocked riverine navigation on the Susquehanna River, and were one of the factors preventing barge or ship water transport from Baltimore and the Chesapeake Bay.

See also 

List of dams and reservoirs of the Susquehanna River
 Wright's Ferry

References 

Map of York Haven Dam area

Landforms of Lancaster County, Pennsylvania
Waterfalls of Pennsylvania
Susquehanna River
Dams completed in 1904
Energy infrastructure completed in 1904
Dams in Pennsylvania
United States power company dams
Crossings of the Susquehanna River
Hydroelectric power plants in Pennsylvania
Buildings and structures in Dauphin County, Pennsylvania
Buildings and structures in Lancaster County, Pennsylvania
Buildings and structures in York County, Pennsylvania
Run-of-the-river power stations
Dams on the Susquehanna River